Agama finchi, commonly known as Finch's agama, is a small species of lizard in the family Agamidae. The species is native to Central Africa and East Africa. There are two recognized subspecies.

Etymology
The specific name, finchi, is in honor of zoologist Brian W. Finch who discovered this species.

Geographic range
A. finchi is found in the Central African Republic, Chad, the Democratic Republic of the Congo, Ethiopia, Kenya, and Uganda.

Habitat
The preferred natural habitat of A. finchi is grassland.

Description
Small for its genus, A. finchi does not exceed  in total length (including tail).

Reproduction
A. finchi is oviparous.

Subspecies
Two subspecies are recognized as being valid including the nominotypical subspecies.

References

Further reading
Böhme W, Wagner P, Malonza P, Lötters S, Köhler J (2005). "A New Species of the Agama agama Group (Squamata: Agamidae) from Western Kenya, East Africa, with Comments on Agama lionotus Boulenger, 1896". Russian Journal of Herpetology 12 (2): 143–150. (Agama finchi, new species).
Spawls S, Howell K, Hinkel H, Menegon M (2018). Field Guide to East African Reptiles, Second Edition. London: Bloomsbury Natural History. 624 pp. . (Agama finchi, p. 229).
Wagner P, Freund W, Modrý D, Schmitz A, Böhme W (2011). "Studies on African Agama IX. New insights into Agama finchi Böhme et al., 2005 (Sauria: Agamidae) with the description of a new subspecies". Bonn zoological Bulletin 60 (1): 25–34. (Agama finchi leucerythrolaema, new subspecies).

Agama (genus)
Agamid lizards of Africa
Reptiles of Ethiopia
Reptiles of Kenya
Reptiles of Uganda
Reptiles described in 2005
Taxa named by Wolfgang Böhme (herpetologist)
Taxa named by Jörn Köhler
Taxa named by Patrick K. Malonza
Taxa named by Philipp Wagner